Evandro Adauto da Silva (born 29 May 1980) is a Brazilian footballer as a striker and attacking midfielder. he is the current goalkeeper coach J1 League club of  Yokohama FC.

He formerly played for Atlético Paranaense, Slavia Prague and Slovakia for MŠK Žilina. On 2 October 2008, Adauto scored the only goal in MŠK Žilina's 1:0 away win against Bulgarian side FC Levski Sofia to enable the team from Slovakia to reach the group stages of the UEFA Cup tournament with an aggregate score of 2:1.

External links

 
 
 Adauto at ZeroZero.pt 
 

1980 births
Living people
People from Santo André, São Paulo
Brazilian footballers
Club Athletico Paranaense players
Associação Atlética Ponte Preta players
Sporting de Gijón players
Czech First League players
SK Slavia Prague players
Slovak Super Liga players
MŠK Žilina players
Expatriate footballers in Spain
Expatriate footballers in the Czech Republic
Expatriate footballers in Slovakia
Brazilian expatriate sportspeople in Slovakia
Brazilian expatriate footballers
Association football forwards
SK Sparta Krč players
Footballers from São Paulo (state)